Special Delivery is a 2002 French comedy film directed by Jeanne Labrune.

Cast 
 Sandrine Kiberlain - Catherine
 Jean-Pierre Darroussin - Raphaël
 Dominique Blanc - Edith
 Mathieu Amalric - Stéphane
 Jean-Claude Brialy - Robert Fresnel
 Maurice Bénichou - Antoine
  - Alice
 Dominique Besnehard - Laurent
  - Emmanuel Kirsch
 Gisèle Casadesus - The lady
 Didier Bezace - The theater director
 László Szabó - The guardian
 Lise Lamétrie - The maid

References

External links 

2002 comedy films
2002 films
French comedy films
2000s French films